The Guilty is a 2018 Danish crime thriller film written by Gustav Möller and Emil Nygaard Albertsen and directed by Möller in his directorial debut. It debuted in the World Cinema Dramatic Competition section at the 2018 Sundance Film Festival., and was later selected as the Danish submission for the Best Foreign Language Film at the 91st Academy Awards, making the December shortlist.

Plot 
Asger Holm, a Copenhagen police officer awaiting a hearing for shooting and killing a 19-year-old man, is assigned to answer emergency calls at the Emergency East desk. On the evening before the hearing, he receives a call from a woman named Iben Østergård who does not say she has an emergency and acts as if she is talking to a child. Initially about to hang up, Asger guesses the distressed Iben is not alone and asks her yes and no questions; she discreetly reveals she has been abducted but explicitly mentions a white van. Tracing the call by the nearest cellphone tower, Asger calls the North Zealand station to tell them to look for a white van driving north. The North Zealand dispatcher tells him this is not enough information, and a licence plate number and specific location are required. Asger talks to an officer in the North Zealand patrol car which pulls over a light-coloured van but lets it go when no woman is found inside.

Becoming absorbed in the case, Asger looks up information about Iben Østergård and finds a home telephone number, calling it. Iben's six-year-old daughter Mathilde answers. Mathilde says her father Michael Berg was at the house, despite being separated from Iben, and drives a white van. Michael had gone into the room of Mathilde's baby brother Oliver and shouted, apparently at Oliver, and then her mother had also gone in and shouted, Mathilde says. Michael then grabbed Iben and left with her. Mathilde also gives Asger her father's phone number, which she has memorised because he is not allowed to see her. Mathilde says she is scared to be alone, so Asger tells her to go and sit with her baby brother before calling North Zealand to have police sent to the house to check on Mathilde and Oliver; he learns Michael has a criminal record.

Night shift arrives and though technically off the job, Asger moves into a separate room to continue following Iben's case. Intermittently, Asger speaks again to Iben, who says she does not want to be locked up. He also speaks to the police at the Østergård house who find Mathilde is covered in blood. The officers check Oliver's room and find the baby has been cut open and is deceased. Asger is devastated and asks his colleague Rashid to break into Michael's house for clues as to his destination. It is revealed that Asger and Rashid have conspired to give false testimony at the hearing into Asger, which worries Rashid. After deliberating, Asger phones Michael's number and argues with him, ending with Asger shouting Michael should be executed.

The van is heading to Elsinore and Asger speaks again to Iben. Worried that Michael might kill Iben, Asger instructs Iben to hit Michael with a brick. Iben says Oliver is fine now and no longer crying. Asger asks her what she means and Iben says Oliver had snakes in his stomach and was crying so she cut them out to help him. The call is disconnected leaving Asger in shock. Asger receives a call from Rashid at Michael's house who finds records showing Michael lost visitation rights due to his criminal record while Iben spent time in a psychiatric hospital in Elsinore. Asger realizes Michael was taking Iben to the hospital because she unknowingly killed their son. He tells Rashid not to lie at the hearing and calls Michael again who says Iben hit him and escaped. Asger receives another call from Iben, who is about to jump off a bridge, after realizing she killed her son. He confesses to her that he shot a man, and it was not in self-defense but he says that unlike him, he knows Iben did not mean to harm anyone. With the noise of police officers approaching, Asger urges her to surrender to them. He speaks again to North Zealand who confirm they have Iben and congratulate him on his work. He gets up from his desk and slowly walks away while his colleagues, who heard his confession to Iben, watch in disbelief. Before exiting the building, Asger makes a phone call.

Cast 
 Jakob Cedergren as Asger Holm
 Jessica Dinnage as Iben Østergård (voice)
  as Rashid (voice)
  as Michael Berg (voice)
  as Mathilde Østergård (voice)
  as Bo (voice)
 Simon Bennebjerg as Nikolaj Jensen (voice)
  as Tanja Brix (voice)
  as Torben

Production 
The genesis of the film was a YouTube clip of a kidnapped woman calling an emergency dispatcher while her kidnapper sat nearby.  Möller was struck by how much an audio clip could convey on its own with no visual accompaniment. "It felt like I was seeing images just listening to sound," he said. "It felt like I had seen this woman; I had an idea of the car she was sitting in and the road they were driving on." Another influence was the podcast Serial, about the 1999 murder of a Maryland student. "With every episode I got new information about the people involved and the places and occurrences. With every episode my image of these people changed." Möller and co-writer Emil Nygaard Albertsen followed up by doing research at Danish dispatch centers, the characters emerged from there, including the idea of the main character being a police officer under investigation, who had been reassigned from the field to desk duty.

The research also inspired the intentionally drab set. "When I got out to the first dispatch center, I had expected something much more high tech," Möller said. "And then I saw this room that looked like a shitty office and I loved that. I loved that contrast of these cops dealing with life and death and they're sitting in this boring, kind of dirty room. So that's what I wanted in the production design."

Confining the film to a police dispatch center helped limit the budget to a frugal €500,000 (US$570,671) while forcing the filmmakers to work more creatively. Möller and his director of photography, Jasper Spanning, divided the script into eight segments, changing the camera lenses and cinematic approach for each.  The screen time for each segment ultimately ranged from 5 to 35 minutes. Filming employed a three-camera setup and took 13 days. Post-production sound editing took another eight weeks.

Distribution rights to The Guilty in the United States were acquired by Magnolia Pictures at the Sundance Film Festival when the film first premiered there.

Reception

Critical reception 
The website's critical consensus reads, "Sleek, well-acted, and intelligently crafted, The Guilty is a high-concept thriller that wrings maximum impact out of a handful of basic—and effective—ingredients." Metacritic assigned the film a normalized score of 83 out of 100, based on 23 critics, indicating "universal acclaim".

Accolades

Remake 

After The Guiltys debut, Möller received requests for remake rights from around the world, but declined personal involvement in any of them, preferring instead to work on new projects. In 2018, it was announced that Nine Stories and Jake Gyllenhaal had bought the American rights to The Guilty with Gyllenhaal set to star. In 2020, it was announced the film would be directed by Antoine Fuqua and be adapted by Nic Pizzolatto. The film was shot at a single Los Angeles location sometime in November. Peter Sarsgaard, Ethan Hawke, and Riley Keough were confirmed to join the cast. In September 2020, Netflix acquired worldwide distribution rights for the film for $30 million.

See also 
 List of submissions to the 91st Academy Awards for Best Foreign Language Film
 List of Danish submissions for the Academy Award for Best Foreign Language Film

References

External links 
 
 
 

2018 films
2018 thriller films
Best Danish Film Robert Award winners
Danish thriller films
2010s Danish-language films
Films about police officers
One-character films